Lorna Graves (1947–2006) was a British artist who worked across a diverse range of media including painting, drawing, printmaking and sculpture. Her artwork was deeply connected to nature, the Cumbrian landscape and ancient cultures.

Early life and career 
Born in Kendal, Graves spent much of her childhood moving around Cumbria with her parents who were itinerant farm workers. This formative experience would inspire her deep connection to the landscape and animals.

She studied earth sciences at London University from 1969 to 1972 before going to art school in Cambridge, and in 1981 began studying at Cumbria College of Art and Design. After this point she worked full-time as a painter and sculptor.

An important early commission was to create studies of the Ruthwell Cross, an 8th Century Anglo-Saxon monument just north of the Scottish border in Dumfries and Galloway. The stylised animal depictions of Christ standing on the heads of beasts would go on to inspire Graves' artwork.

In the mid nineties she moved her studio to the Barbican in London but had returned to Cumbria by 2001.

She continued to produce work, including important commissions such as a crucifix for Carver Memorial Church in Windermere and a collaboration with Welfare State International, for which she created a hand-painted coffin. Her work has been shown across the UK, Japan, Germany and the United States.

Her artwork is held by collections including: Tullie House Museum, Abbott Hall Art Gallery, Penrith and Eden Museum and other public collections.

Artwork 
Graves used simple forms in her work to represent archetypes such as Cumbrian woman, beast, fish, boat, landscape, angel, standing stones. These stylised shapes express core elemental forms and are suggestive of prehistoric art. Her artwork is instinctive and conveys a spiritual link with nature.

Sculpture 
Her sculpture was typically stoneware ceramic and she used the Western style of Raku glazing in which, after modelling and firing, her sculptures were set amongst combustible material such as twigs and leaves. In burning, the smoke and remnants of these objects leave behind marks and traces on the body of the sculpture and give an aged and bone-like appearance. This held a ritual and spiritual significance for the artist and she included her father's ashes as part of the work Burial Ground.

Painting 
Graves also made use of simplified forms and recurring archetypes in her painting. As with her sculpture, she focused on recurring symbols such as simplified upland landscapes with strong horizons; angels, boats and animal figures.

Notable exhibitions and awards 

 Oppenheim-Downs Memorial Award 2001
 Body and Soul June, Pyramid Gallery, June 2013 - July 2013
 Lorna Graves (1947-2006): Memories of Belonging, Penrith and Eden Museum,  March 2018 - June 2018

Works in public collections

References 

British women ceramicists
English women sculptors
20th-century British artists
1947 births
2006 deaths
English sculptors
English ceramicists
20th-century English women
20th-century English people